Slow Charm is the seventh studio album by the American rock band The Figgs. It was released on September 10, 2002 by Hearbox/Good Land. Slow Charm was recorded and mixed between May 2001 and March 2002 at Peligro Audio-NYC, Green St. House-NH, Bricktown-Norristown, PA, and The Amazing Barn-Conshaken, PA. It was produced by Tim O’Heir, Pete Donnelly, and The Figgs and mixed by Donnelly, Dave Minehan, and Mike Gent at Minehan's Wooly Mammoth-Boston, MA.

Track listing

References

2002 albums
The Figgs albums